The 6th Vanier Cup was played on November 21, 1970, at Varsity Stadium in Toronto, Ontario, and decided the CIAU football champion for the 1970 season. The Manitoba Bisons became the first team to repeat as national champions as they won their second championship by defeating the Ottawa Gee-Gees by a score of 38-11.

References

External links
 Official website

Vanier Cup
Vanier Cup
1970 in Toronto
November 1970 sports events in Canada
Canadian football competitions in Toronto